William Mellish (c. 1764–1838) was an English Tory politician and banker.

He was the third son of William Mellish of Blyth, Nottinghamshire by his second wife Anne Gore.

With his brother John, he owned the business of John and William Mellish & Co. Having served as a director and Deputy Governor, Mellish was made Governor of the Bank of England from 1814 to 1816.

He was elected Member of Parliament (MP) for Great Grimsby from 1796 to 1802 and from 1803 to 1806, then as MP for Middlesex from 1806 to 1820.

He never married.

References

Oxford Dictionary of National Biography, Mellish, William (1764?–1838), banker and politician by Michael Reed

External links 
 

1760s births
1838 deaths
Governors of the Bank of England
Tory MPs (pre-1834)
Members of the Parliament of Great Britain for Great Grimsby
British MPs 1796–1800
Members of the Parliament of the United Kingdom for Great Grimsby
UK MPs 1801–1802
UK MPs 1802–1806
Deputy Governors of the Bank of England
William